Jordon Sangha (born 4 January 1998) is an English former professional footballer and current semi-professional footballer who plays as a midfielder for Gornal Athletic.

Playing career
Sangha was born in West Bromwich, and joined the Walsall youth-team at the age of eight. He was named as Apprentice of the Season for the 2015–16 season. On 22 September 2016, he joined National League North side A.F.C. Telford United on a one-month loan deal. He made his senior debut two days later, in a 0–0 draw with Chorley at the New Bucks Head, coming on as a 75th-minute substitute for David Hibbert. He made three further appearances for the "Bucks". On 8 November, he made his first-team debut for Walsall after coming on as a 78th-minute substitute for Amadou Bakayoko in a 1–0 victory over Leicester City U23 at the King Power Stadium. He signed a new contract with the "Saddlers" in March 2017.

On 20 October 2017, he joined Rushall Olympic of the Northern Premier League Premier Division on a one-month loan deal. On 22 March 2018, he returned to the National League North on a one-month loan at Leamington. He made just two appearances for the "Brakes", featuring for a total of just 26 minutes.

On 11 September 2018, he joined National League North side Ashton United on loan, and made his debut for the "Robins" four days later in a 2–0 win at Hereford.

He was released by Walsall at the end of the 2018–19 season and moved into non-league football with Evesham United, Wrens Nest and Gornal Athletic.

Statistics

References

1998 births
Living people
Sportspeople from West Bromwich
English footballers
Association football midfielders
Walsall F.C. players
AFC Telford United players
Rushall Olympic F.C. players
Leamington F.C. players
Ashton United F.C. players
National League (English football) players
Northern Premier League players
English Football League players
Gornal Athletic F.C. players